The rufous-winged philentoma (Philentoma pyrhoptera) is a bird species. They are now usually assigned to the Vangidae.
It is found in Brunei, Indonesia, Malaysia, Myanmar, Thailand, and Vietnam.
Its natural habitat is subtropical or tropical moist lowland forests.

Gallery

References

rufous-winged philentoma
Birds of Malesia
rufous-winged philentoma
Taxonomy articles created by Polbot